Monique Baelden (10 April 1938 – 17 November 2015) was a French gymnast. She competed in five events at the 1964 Summer Olympics, but never placed higher than 44th in any event.

References

1938 births
2015 deaths
French female artistic gymnasts
Olympic gymnasts of France
Gymnasts at the 1964 Summer Olympics
20th-century French women